Hořín is a municipality and village in Mělník District in the Central Bohemian Region of the Czech Republic. It has about 900 inhabitants.

Administrative parts
Villages of Brozánky, Vrbno and Zelčín are administrative parts of Hořín.

Geography
It lies in a flat landscape in the Central Elbe Table. The Vraňany–Hořín Shipping Channel also leads through the territory.

History
The first written mention of Hořín is from 1319. There used to be a fortress, which was destroyed during the Hussite Wars. From the 16th century, Hořín served as an important economic background for the Mělník estate.

The village of Hořín was badly damaged during the 2002 European floods and has been protected by a flood wall since then.

Demographics

Sights

The landmark of Hořín is the Church of Saint Nicholas. It was built in the late Baroque style in second half of the 18th century. It includes a valuable Baroque mortuary.

The Baroque castle in Hořín dates was built for the Czernin family around 1696, then it was rebuilt by František Maxmilián Kaňka in 1713–1720. Another modifications took place in 1736–1746. The interior contains valuable Rococo decoration. Today the castle is owned by the Lobkowicz family, and is abandoned and unused. Next to the castle in an extensive park. On the local cemetery is the burial vault of the Lobkowicz family.

There is a lock from 1905, which is protected as a technical monument.

The historic centre of the village of Vrbno is protected as a village monument zone. There is a set of well-preserved agricultural homesteads. The landmark of the village is the Romanesque church of the Exaltation of the Holy Cross.

In Zelčín is a zoopark which claims that it is "the largest contact zoo in Bohemia."

Notable people
Jan August Vitásek (1770–1839), composer

References

External links

Villages in Mělník District